Procrita is a genus of flies belonging to the family Lauxaniidae.

Species
Species:

Procrita pectinata 
Procrita sigma

References

Lauxaniidae